Yehudah Joshua Glick (born 20 November 1965), alternatively spelled "Yehuda Glick", is an American-born Israeli Orthodox rabbi, activist, and politician. As the President of Shalom Jerusalem Foundation, he campaigns for expanding Jewish access to the Temple Mount. He was a member of the Knesset for Likud, having taken the place of former Defense Minister Moshe Ya'alon in May 2016 until April 2019.

Glick is the leader of HaLiba, a coalition of groups dedicated to "reaching complete and comprehensive freedom and civil rights for Jews on the Temple Mount".

Glick was awarded the 2015 Moskowitz Prize for Zionism for being "Active for human rights and religious freedom on Jerusalem's Temple Mount". He also has been referred as a "right-wing" Israeli activist. On 29 October 2014, Glick survived an assassination attempt by Mutaz Hijazi, a member of Islamic Jihad Movement in Palestine.

Early life and education
Yehudah Glick was born on 20 November 1965 in the United States to American Jewish parents, Brenda and Shimon Glick. His father, a physician and professor specializing in endocrinology research and medical ethics, made aliyah with his family from the United States in 1974, and helped found Ben Gurion University's school of medicine.

Glick served in the IDF between 1986 and 1989, as part of Yeshivat Har Etzion, the hesder yeshiva that he attended. Glick initially served in the Armored Corps, and later in the Intelligence Corps. He completed a combat medics course, and served as a combat medic and regional defence soldier during reserve duty. Glick holds a Bachelor of Education in Bible Studies from Jerusalem College of Technology, and an MA in Jewish History from Touro College. He is also a licensed tour-guide for the Ministry of Tourism.

Early career
In 1996, Glick began working in the Ministry of Immigrant Absorption, filling several positions, including spokesperson for Minister Yuli Edelstein, director of the Public Diplomacy Department in the Ministry, Director of the Jewish Identity Unit, and Director of the Ashkelon and South Israel region. In 2005, after 10 years of work in the Ministry, Glick resigned in protest of the Gaza Disengagement Plan.

After leaving his position in the Ministry of Immigration and Absorption, Glick took a greater leading role in the Temple Movement, becoming the executive director of the Temple Institute in 2005, which is a state-funded organization that supports the building of the Third Temple on the Temple Mount.

After leaving the Temple Institute in 2009, Glick founded a series of organizations that promote and popularize the Temple Movement through liberal discourse, including the Temple Mount Heritage Foundation in 2009, and The Liba Initiative for Jewish Freedom on the Temple Mount, Human Rights on Temple Mount  and currently chairs the Shalom Jerusalem Foundation since 2019.

Activism
Glick advocates opening the Temple Mount on an equal footing to prayer by Muslims, Jews, Christians, and others. He has been called "a symbol of the struggle for Jewish prayer on the Temple Mount". And has been described as representing the recent shift in the demand for Jewish prayer to be permitted on the Temple Mount on an equal footing with Muslim prayer from the fringe to the mainstream of Israeli society. Glick has spoken about his vision of a utopian Temple Mount. It would include a "House of prayer for all Nations", with the Dome of the Rock standing alongside a rebuilt Jewish sacrificial altar. On March 26, 2018, two sacrificial lambs were slaughtered by priests near the Temple Mount in a ceremony attended by the subject, senior National Religious rabbis Dov Lior, Yisrael Ariel, and hundreds of citizens.
Haaretz journalist Nir Hasson credits Glick as having put the Israeli left on the defensive by "uncover(ing) the absurdity created at the Temple Mount" by a status quo that, by permitting Muslim prayer, while prohibiting Jewish prayer, "discriminates against people because of their religion".

Glick has led groups of Jews to walk the Temple Mount, and has been repeatedly arrested while praying, walking, and filming videos on the Temple Mount.

On 10 October 2013, Glick began a hunger strike protesting a police ban forbidding him to ascend to the Temple Mount. After 12 days, the police relented, agreeing to permit him to enter the site on the same terms as other Jewish visitors, that is, only to visit, not to pray. An Israeli court awarded damages to Glick for two wrongful arrests that took place as he attempted to film officials denying entry to the Temple Mount to Jews dressed in visibly religious clothing.

Glick was arrested in August 2014 for allegedly pushing a member of the Muslim women's guard at the Temple Mount, and was charged in mid-October for causing the woman to fall and break her arm. Glick's attorney said that there "was no direct evidence that Glick had assaulted" the woman. A condition of Glick's release on bail was to ban him from entering the area during the legal proceedings. The Israeli police argued in the court in December, in relation to the appeal of the ban, that "allowing Glick on the site posed a threat to public order". He sued in response to sue the Israeli police over his ban from the site, and was later awarded NIS 650,000 in damages and legal costs due to his ban. Additionally, as part of its ruling, the court upheld that Jewish prayer on the Temple Mount is legal.

On 4 June 2015, a Jerusalem district court banned Glick from entering Temple Mount, overturning a lower court decision. The judge ruled that Glick's presence was inflammatory, and that, "there is a risk of violence breaking out if the respondent returns to the compound before the end of legal proceedings in his case". On 25 February 2016, the police dropped their charges against Glick.

Glick has stated that the Muslim leadership's persistence in refusing to open up the Temple Mount to all monotheisms will bring about 'a very dangerous ... to a great threat to the world and to the peace of the world'. Shany Littman, writing for Haaretz, describes him giving talks at a meeting in an Orthodox Jerusalem neighborhood where Meir Kahane's poster features, together with activists like Hillel Weiss, head of Lishkat Hagazit, which is dedicated to appointing a king of Israel, wiping out the seed of Amalek, and building the Temple; and Einat Ziv and Yehudit Dasberg from the Women's Forum for the Temple.

During his tenure in the 20th Knesset, Glick continued his Temple Mount activism campaign, but was barred from visiting the Temple Mount itself several times over the years due to the potentially incendiary nature of his activism campaigns.

Assassination attempt

On 29 October 2014, Glick gave a speech at the Menachem Begin Heritage Center in Jerusalem. According to eyewitness Shay Malka (Parliamentary Assistant of MK Moshe Feiglin), a man on a motorcycle who spoke with a "thick Arab accent" approached Glick as he loaded equipment into the back of his car after speaking at a conference, and asked if he was Yehudah Glick, before shooting him in the chest 4 times and speeding off.

Glick survived the assassination attempt, and was taken to Shaare Zedek Medical Center for treatment. Glick later told a rabbi that the gunman had apologized before firing at him, saying: "I'm very sorry, but you're an enemy of Al-Aqsa, I have to."

After having undergone several surgeries, and being heavily sedated, Glick began showing signs of improvement on 5 November. He began to recognize family members, and to be able to communicate "yes" or "no" with a nod of the head. On 11 November, Glick was finally able to breathe on his own, as well as to speak. One of the first people he spoke to after regaining the ability was Knesset Speaker Yuli Edelstein, whom he called by phone, saying, "I know you fight for the right to speak, and for the last few days, I have been fighting to breathe - so, now, I'm breathing alone, and I want to share that with you." He was eventually released from hospital on 24 November.

Police traced the suspected assailant, Mutaz Hijazi, to the mixed Arab/Jewish neighborhood of Abu Tor. Israeli police said their attempts at arrest were met by gunfire, a claim Hijazi's family denies, which resulted in Hijazi being shot and killed. Following the shootout with police, riots and protests broke out in the Abu Tor neighborhood. Police spokesman Micky Rosenfeld stated that the raid of Hijazi's apartment that followed the shoot-out provided them with substantial evidence linking Hijazi to the shooting. Hijazi family's claimed the authorities had not provided them with the results of the investigation which links the suspect to the attempted assassination.

According to Palestinian sources,  Glick's lawyers asked for the entire home where Hijazi lived to be demolished. Although originally stating Hijazi's home would be demolished, they later stated the home would not be destroyed, and only the portion of the home where Hijazi lived would be sealed off.

Hijazi had been a member of Islamic Jihad and served 11 years in Israeli prisons for security offenses; Islamic Jihad immediately published an obituary claiming him as a member. The director of the Jerusalem branch of Fatah said, "We in Fatah are not ashamed to take responsibility for the heroic act he [Hijazi] carried out today."

Reactions
Right-wing activists immediately called for peaceful marches to the Temple Mount on the morning following the late evening assassination attempt. Security officials immediately closed access to the Temple Mount. Israel's Minister of the Economy, Naftali Bennett, said that the targeted assassination attempt crossed "a red line of blood", and called on Prime Minister Benjamin Netanyahu to "restore the sovereignty of Israel and its capital".

Speaking on behalf of Islamic Jihad the morning after the shooting, Daoud Shihab said that Glick "got what he deserved". It was reported that Palestinian President Mahmoud Abbas sent a condolence letter to the family of the shooter after he was killed by the police. Israeli Prime Minister Benjamin Netanyahu reacted by saying, "When we are trying to calm the situation, Abu Mazen sends condolences over the death of one who tried to perpetrate a reprehensible murder. The time has come for the international community to condemn him for such actions." Israeli Foreign Minister Avigdor Lieberman said, "This shows that Abu Mazen is a partner, a partner for terror, a partner for terrorists, a partner for murders. This despicable letter by Abu Mazen openly supports terror and encourages further killings."

Political career
Glick was placed thirty-third on the Likud list for the 2015 Knesset elections, but the party won only 30 seats. However, after the resignation of two other Likud MKs, Glick became next-in-line for a seat in December 2015, and was attending Likud faction meetings. In May 2016, former Defense Minister Moshe Ya'alon resigned from the Knesset, resulting in Glick entering the Knesset; he was officially sworn in on 25 May. He was a candidate for President in the 2021 presidential election.

Personal life 
Yehudah Glick was married to Yaffa (née Langental), the sister of Nahum Langental and of rabbi Shmuel Tal, head of Yeshivat Torat HaChaim. She was a widow with two children from her previous marriage when he married her. Together they had four biological children and two foster children. In January 2016, their neighbor in the Otniel settlement where they lived at the time, Dafna Meir, was stabbed to death in her home in front of her four children. Yehudah Glick and his wife also became the legal guardians to the six children of Yitzhak and Tali Ames after they were murdered by terrorists in 2010. His wife died on 1 January 2018, following a stroke 6 months earlier. On January 1, 2019, exactly a year after his wife's death, Glick announced his engagement to Hadas Disin. They married on January 28,2019. Glick resides in Jerusalem.

See also
Assassination of Rehavam Ze'evi
List of people who survived assassination attempts
Religious Zionism
Temple Mount entry restrictions

References

External links
 Yehudah Glick as President of Shalom Jerusalem Foundation

Collected news and commentary at Arutz Sheva

1965 births
Living people
20th-century Israeli rabbis
21st-century Israeli rabbis
American emigrants to Israel
American Orthodox Jews
Israeli activists
Israeli civil servants
Israeli Orthodox rabbis
Israeli settlers
Israeli terrorism victims
Jewish activists
Likud politicians
Members of the 20th Knesset (2015–2019)
Politicians from Beersheba
Religious Zionist Orthodox rabbis
Shooting survivors
Survivors of terrorist attacks
Temple Mount
Terrorist attacks attributed to Palestinian militant groups
Terrorist incidents in Israel in 2014
Place of birth missing (living people)
Tour guides
Jerusalem College of Technology alumni
Moskowitz Prize for Zionism laureates
Anti-Islam sentiment in Israel
Yeshivat Har Etzion